The Megalariaceae are a family of lichenized fungi in the order Lecanorales. Species of this family have a widespread distribution.

References

Lecanoromycetes families
Lecanorales
Lichen families
Taxa named by Josef Hafellner
Taxa described in 1984